Sandend is a small fishing village near Banff and Portsoy, Scotland, typical of the area. It was "a considerable seatown as early as 1624".

In the late 19th and early 20th centuries it was an active village. There were two fish-houses in Sandend (Smith's and McKay's). After McKay's relocation to Buckie, only Smith's remains in Sandend.

It now is a popular place for caravaners, holidaymakers and watersports enthusiasts. Local attractions include a sandy beach and an annual kipper barbecue, held in summer.

In January 2018, locals opposed plans for a wind farm, the Moray West Offshore Windfarm, that would have affected the beach. In July 2018 the wind farm was moved further up the coast.

It is home to the Glenglassaugh distillery.

Findlater Castle is nearby, while Birkenbog House, built in the early 18th century, is the ancient seat of the Abercrombies, who eventually left for Glassaugh. It was abandoned as of 1990.

References 

Villages in Aberdeenshire